Florbal MB (Předvýběr.CZ Florbal Mladá Boleslav after its sponsor) is a floorball team based in Mladá Boleslav, Czech Republic. The current club was formed in 2003 by merging FbK Mladá Boleslav (1999) and Sokol Mladá Boleslav (1998).

The men's team have played in the highest Czech floorball league, Superliga florbalu, since the season 2004–05, after being promoted from a lower league. With three titles in the 2017–18, 2020–21 and 2021–22 seasons, it is the third most successful team of the league, after Tatran Střešovice and 1. SC Vítkovice. The team was only fourth one to win a title, and the first one that started in a lower league. The team also won three second places, in the seasons 2014–15, 2016–17, and 2018–19.

Honours

Titles
 Superliga florbalu: 2017–18, 2020–21 and 2021–22

References

External links
 Official website 
 Club profile 

Czech floorball teams
Sport in Mladá Boleslav